Edward Synge (1726–1792) was an 18th-century  Anglican priest in Ireland.

He was educated at Trinity College, Dublin. A prebendary of Lackeen in Killaloe Cathedral, Synge was Archdeacon of Killaloe from 1761 until his own resignation in 1785 when he was succeeded by his son Samuel.

References

Alumni of Trinity College Dublin
18th-century Irish Anglican priests
Archdeacons of Killaloe
1726 births
1792 deaths